Carolyn Jourdan is an American author, USA Today, Audible, and six-time Wall Street Journal top-ten bestselling memoirist, biographer, and mystery writer.

Biography 
Jourdan's first book, a memoir, Heart in the Right Place, was a Wall Street Journal No. 7 bestseller in 2012 and No. 9 bestseller in 2017.

Heart in the Right Place is the true story of a spoiled, high-powered United States Senate lawyer who gives up a glamorous life in Washington, DC and comes back home to the Great Smoky Mountains to work as an inept receptionist in her father's rural medical office. It was published by Algonquin Books of Chapel Hill in 2007 (hardback) and 2008 (paperback). According to WorldCat, it is held in 912 libraries.

Family Circle magazine chose Heart in the Right Place as its first ever Book of the Month, and Elle awarded it a Readers Prize. It was honored in Michigan with a One City One Book in the Capital Area Reads One Book in 2010.

Medicine Men: Extreme Appalachian Doctoring (2012) was Jourdan's second book. It was a Wall Street Journal #5 bestseller in 2014,  a 
Wall Street Journal No. 6 bestseller in 2015, and a 
Wall Street Journal No. 9 bestseller in 2022,.  Medicine Men was No. 1 in Biography & Memoir, Science, and Medicine on Amazon. It is a follow-on to Heart in the Right Place and is a collection of true stories from Jourdan's family and over a dozen physicians who practiced in Southern Appalachia.

Bear in the Back Seat: Adventures of a Wildlife Ranger in the Great Smoky Mountains National Park is a two-part memoir with Kim DeLozier. It was a Wall Street Journal No. 9 bestseller in 2013 and No. 7 audio book bestseller in 2016. It describes DeLozier's 32-year career dealing with wildlife.

Her medical mystery, Out on a Limb: A Smoky Mountain Mystery (2013), was a USA Today best seller and voted a Best Kindle Book of 2014. The French translation of the book, Suspendue, was shortlisted for the Cognac Thriller Prize, the Prix Polar International. It deals with East Tennessee and the Great Smoky Mountains National Park, with an emphasis on the insular and quirky local culture.

Jourdan's work has been translated into French, German, and Hungarian.

Jourdan is a former Counsel to the United States Senate Committee on Environment and Public Works and the United States Senate Committee on Governmental Affairs. She has degrees from the University of Tennessee in Biomedical Engineering and Law.

Bibliography

Nonfiction

Medical
Heart in the Right Place: A Memoir (2007) 
Medicine Men: Extreme Appalachian Doctoring (2012) 
Radiologists at Work: Saving Lives with the Lights Off (2015) 
Talking to Skeletons: Behind the Scenes With a Radiologist (2015) 
Nurse: The Art of Caring (2016)

Wildlife
Bear in the Back Seat I: Adventures of a Wildlife Ranger in the Great Smoky Mountains National Park (2013) 
Bear in the Back Seat II: Adventures of a Wildlife Ranger in the Great Smoky Mountains National Park (2014) 
Bear Bloopers: True Stories from the Great Smoky Mountains National Park (2014) 
Waltzing with Wildlife: 10 Things NOT to Do in Our National Parks (2016 ebook) 
Dangerous Beauty: Stories from the Wilds of Yellowstone (2017)

Writing
How to Write, Edit & Publish Your Memoir: Advice From a Best-Selling Memoirist (2018)

Fiction

Mystery
Out on a Limb: A Smoky Mountain Mystery (2013) 
School for Mysteries: A Midlife Fairy Tale Adventure (2014) 
School for Psychics: A Midlife Fairy Tale Adventure (2014) 
Breakdown on Blowhard Mountain: A Travel Mystery (2019)

References

 "Carolyn Jourdan" in Contemporary authors. : Volume 263 a bio-bibliographical guide to current writers in fiction, general nonfiction, poetry, journalism, drama, motion pictures, television, and other fields Gale, 2008

External links
 Official website
 Author page at Algonquin/Workman
 Author Central Amazon page

Living people
Year of birth missing (living people)
American women novelists
21st-century American memoirists
American women memoirists
21st-century American novelists
21st-century American women writers
University of Tennessee alumni